Katghara is a village in Ram Nagar Block of Mariahu Tehsil of Jaunpur district of Uttar Pradesh, India. Its Postal Zip Code is 222161

Geography
Katghara rises 285 feet above sea level. Its geographical position is 25°34' North, 82°36' East.

Inside the village
A canal runs through the village from north to south. There is also a lake (Talab or Pokhara) and Shiv Temple.

Government offices
Katghara has various government offices and educational institutes such as a veterinary hospital, government telephone exchange office, Government Model School and a Jawahar Navodaya Vidyalaya.

Social structure

People of this village belonging to various castes like Mirza, Kayastha, Yadav, Rajputs, Brahmins, Pal (Shepherd), Harijans (or Dalit), Kahars.

Villages in Jaunpur district